Erg is a fictional mutant character appearing in American comic books published by Marvel Comics.

Erg makes his first live action appearance on the second season of the television series The Gifted as the leader of the Morlocks played by Michael Luwoye.

Publication history
Erg's first appearance was in Power Pack #12 (July 1985), and he was created by Louise Simonson and June Brigman.

The character subsequently appears in The Uncanny X-Men #195 (July 1985), X-Factor #10 (Nov. 1986), Power Pack #27 (Dec. 1986), X-Factor #11-12 (Dec. 1986-Jan. 1987), #15 (April 1987), Decimation: House of M - The Day After #1 (Jan. 2006), X-Men: The 198 #1 (March 2006), X-Men: The 198 Files #1 (March 2006), X-Men #183 (April 2006), X-Men: The 198 #2-5 (April–July 2006), and The Uncanny X-Men #487-491 (Aug.–Dec. 2007).

Erg appeared as part of the "Morlocks" entry in The Official Handbook of the Marvel Universe Deluxe Edition #9.

Fictional character biography
Erg was a member of the Morlocks, and was one of the few Morlocks to survive the Marauders' attack during the 'Mutant Massacre'. He was also one of the first mutants to seek a safe haven at the Xavier Institute following M-Day, when most mutants lost their powers. Erg, Mammomax, and Peepers were running from members of the murderous Sapien League. They had the institute in sight when they were taken down by a shock grenade and tasers. The Leper Queen orders her men to kill them. The League members set up three St. Andrew's crosses (which are "X" shaped) with braces to keep the crosses upright. Erg is tied to one of the crosses. Gasoline was poured on and a lit match tossed. Erg regains consciousness when the lower legs of the cross were blazing. He would have died if he hadn't been yanked off by Wolverine. The X-Man had been sitting in the Xavier estate woods, letting Colossus sketch him.

Erg remained at the Xavier Institute with many other mutants, some unwillingly, becoming something of a ringleader for the non-X-Men members of the 198. It was Erg's idea to raise a "198" flag, the number representing what was originally thought to be the number of mutants left in the world after the Decimation. He was also one of a few mutants who attacked Sentinel Squad O*N*E (Office of National Emergency) because they want to leave the Xavier estate. 

Erg was also one of the unfortunate mutants who accepted having an electronic tag inserted in order to be allowed to go out on a supervised group trip to Salem Center. Dr. Cooper told the mutants that the tags were "...a harmless tracking device, inserted under the skin with a simple and painless surgical process". That was not true, as Erg later discovered, as the tags had the ability to generate disabling electronic pulses. Later, Mister M freed the chipped mutants of their devices.

The Extremists
During "The Extremists" arc, Erg reappeared alongside some of his fellow Morlocks under the leadership of Masque. Besides Erg, this group consisted of Bliss, Litterbug,  the undercover Skids, and the captured Leech.

Dark Reign
Erg is shown as one of Norman Osborn's mutant prisoners after the riots in San Francisco. He later took refuge on Utopia, and participated in the fight against the attacking Nimrods.

Powers and abilities
Erg is a mutant who is able to absorb all forms of energy and project them in blasts from his right eye, which he calls his "electric eye".

In other media
Erg has appeared in a few episodes of the X-Men: The Animated Series with his fellow Morlocks and fought the X-Men.
Erg has appeared in a few episodes of the television series, The Gifted. He is black, has a special eyepatch covers his left eye, and he has the trademark 'M' scar which was self-inflicted and used as a statement of Erg's mutant pride. It is also shown that Erg and his fellow Morlocks just want to live care-free in the tunnels, being neutral rather than for a certain side. In the episode, coMplications, mutants John Proudstar and Clarice Fong, go to the sewers to find Erg in order to get information on Lorna Dane and Andy Strucker. There, they meet the Morlocks, which Erg is the leader of. He asks Clarice to be a spy for the Morlocks and in return, he gives them the information they need. In the episode, afterMath, a bunch of mutants were released from a mental institution and need shelter. Clarice thinks Erg's Morlock Tunnels can help them. Erg is against this but Clarice gives him information and eventually talks him into taking the mutant refugees, as long as they inflict themselves with the 'M' scar. At the end of the episode, Erg gives Clarice her hero name: Blink. He later appears in subsequent episodes, "meMento", "hoMe", and "teMpted", whenever the Mutant Underground needs help or vice versa.

References

External links
 Erg at Marvel.com

Characters created by Louise Simonson
Comics characters introduced in 1985
Marvel Comics mutants
Marvel Comics superheroes
X-Men supporting characters